Busi is an Italian surname that may refer to the following notable people:
Aldo Busi (born 1948), Italian writer and translator
Alessia Busi (born 1994), Italian ice dancer
Giambattista Busi (born 1968), Italian racing driver
 Giovanni Busi, an Italian painter active during the Renaissance
Luigi Busi (1837–1884), Italian painter
Maxime Busi (born 1999), Belgian football defender